Brinded is a surname. Notable people with the surname include:

Colin Brinded (1946–2005), English snooker referee
Malcolm Brinded (born 1953), British businessman

Thrice the brinded cat hath mew'd. Shakespeare, Macbeth.